Duplay is a surname. Notable people with the surname include:

Éléonore Duplay (1768–1832), French painter
Maurice Duplay (1736–1820), French carpentry contractor and revolutionary in the French Revolution
Simon-Emmanuel Duplay (1836–1924), French surgeon

French-language surnames